Vanzosaura savanicola is a species of lizard in the family Gymnophthalmidae. It is endemic to Brazil.

References

Vanzosaura
Reptiles of Brazil
Endemic fauna of Brazil
Reptiles described in 2014
Taxa named by Renato Recoder
Taxa named by Fernanda P. Werneck
Taxa named by Mauro Teixeira Jr.
Taxa named by Guarino R. Colli
Taxa named by Jack W. Sites Jr.
Taxa named by Miguel Trefaut Rodrigues